The College of Dairy Technology, Etawah is a government college in Etawah, Uttar Pradesh, India. It is also known as Faculty of Dairy Technology, Chandra Shekhar Azad University of Agriculture and Technology.

See also
National Dairy Research Institute
Chandra Shekhar Azad University of Agriculture and Technology
Baba Saheb Dr. B.R.A. College of Agriculture Engineering & Technology
College of Fisheries Science and Research Centre

References

External links
 Official website

Universities and colleges in Etawah district
Engineering colleges in Uttar Pradesh
Agricultural universities and colleges in Uttar Pradesh
Education in Etawah
Chandra Shekhar Azad University of Agriculture and Technology
Dairy farming in India
Dairy organizations